Taihu Bridge is a bridge located in Suzhou, Jiangsu, linking Xukou and Xishan Island in the Lake Tai, with a total length of 4,308 meters. The construction began on October 27, 1992 and finished on October 25, 1994. The total cost of this bridge is over 100 million yuan at that time, raised by Wu County. Due to rapid development of tourism, the bridge has been increasingly overcrowded. The municipal government of Suzhou has decided to build a new bridge parallel to this one.

References

Bridges in Suzhou
Bridges completed in 1994
Wuzhong District
1994 establishments in China